Actebia opisoleuca is a moth of the family Noctuidae. It is found in Turkey.

External links
Noctuinae (Noctuidae) collection of Siberian Zoological Museum

Noctuinae
Endemic fauna of Turkey
Moths described in 1881
Moths of Asia